Jesse Malin (born January 26, 1967) is an American rock musician, guitarist, and songwriter. Starting his performing career in the New York hardcore band Heart Attack, and rising to prominence as vocalist of D Generation,  a solo recording artist, having recorded numerous albums including the Lucinda Williams produced Sunset Kids.  Over the course of his career, Malin has collaborated with Bruce Springsteen, Billie Joe Armstrong of Green Day, Ryan Adams and numerous other musicians.

Biography

Early career
Born January 26, 1967, Jesse Malin began his music career, at the age of 12, as the front-man for the seminal New York City hardcore band Heart Attack.  The band auditioned at CBGBs but were denied because they couldn't bring in a drinking crowd to the bar. Following the demise of Heart Attack in 1984, Jesse worked on several other projects, including the band Hope, before joining the band D Generation for which he was the lead singer. As one of New York City's most noted bands of the 1990s, D Generation released three albums, including the critically acclaimed No Lunch, before eventually disbanding in April 1999. The band reunited and released it fourth album, Nothing Is Anywhere, in 2016.

Malin didn't stop writing music and went on to form two other projects, PCP Highway (with former D Generation bandmates Howie Pyro and Joe Rizzo) and Bellvue (also named Tsing-Tsing for a brief time); the latter band released one album, To Be Somebody, on Goldenseal Records. The album included versions of songs that would later be reworked for Malin's first two solo albums, including "Solitaire", "Basement Home", "Brooklyn" and "Downliner".

Solo career
Being a fan of Neil Young, Tom Waits, and Steve Earle affected his work; Malin spent the next two years working on a fresh sound. Former Whiskeytown front-man Ryan Adams, who'd been a friend of Malin since the D Generation days, was impressed with Malin's new material. Adams offered to produce Malin's debut album despite the fact that he'd never produced a record before. The two headed into Loho Studios in New York in January 2001 and made an album in just six days. A deal with Artemis Records soon followed. The Fine Art of Self Destruction appeared in the United Kingdom in October 2002. The lead off first single, "Queen of the Underworld" was a moderate hit and the British press quickly hailed Malin's debut as one of the year's best. 

Stateside fans were eventually able to purchase the album The Fine Art of Self Destruction in January 2003. Tour dates followed, both in America and the United Kingdom. Malin contributed to two  cover albums, first he covered "Hungry Heart" for Light of Day: A Tribute to Bruce Springsteen, and then he recorded a cover of The Clash's "Death Or Glory" on the tribute White Riot Vol. 2: A Tribute to The Clash. He also picked up a nomination for the Shortlist Music Prize.

By November 2003 he was back in the studio recording tracks for his second album, The Heat, which was released in June 2004, accompanied by a string of tour dates on both sides of the Atlantic.

Malin has also collaborated with Ryan Adams & Johnny T to form the band The Finger (the pair adopted the pseudonyms "Irving Plaza" and "Warren Peace" respectively) who released two EPs which were later collected into the album We Are Fuck You.

Malin's album, Glitter in the Gutter was released on March 20, 2007. It also featured a cover of The Replacements' "Bastards of Young" and a duet with Bruce Springsteen on "Broken Radio." A music video was also made to accompany "Broken Radio."

Malin released a 'live in the studio' album, Love It To Life in November 2007 on the One Little Indian label for sale in the UK. Recorded live at Gigantic Recording Studios in New York City, it featured songs from his previous albums. He used the title again in 2010 for an album of new material.

Malin released a cover album on 7 April 2008 entitled On Your Sleeve, containing covers of songs by, among others, The Ramones, Sam Cooke, Neil Young and The Hold Steady, as well as a studio recording of a long-time live favourite, Fred Neil's "Everybody's Talkin'."

In 2010, Malin formed a band called Jesse Malin and the St. Mark's Social and released a new album called Love It To Life; the title comes from a quote by Joe Strummer. (The title was previously used on a 2007 UK release of live material on the One Little Indian label.) Featuring a more rockier approach, the album's first single was "Burning The Bowery" and next single was "All The Way From Moscow."

Malin was also a judge for the 9th annual Independent Music Awards.

In December 2010, Malin, along members of Green Day, formed the band Rodeo Queens. They released one song, along with a video, called "Depression Times".

Malin has also done some film work and he had a role in Martin Scorsese's Bringing Out The Dead (1999). He did the music supervision on the documentary Burning Down the House: The Story of CBGB and he was associate producer with Bad Brains from DC. In addition he hosted the show "New York Nights" on Sirius XM's Spectrum with John Varvatos from 2011 to 2014. Malin released New York Before The War in March 2015 through One Little Indian / Velvet Elk Records.

Since 2019, Malin has been a DJ on Litte Steven's Underground Garage. Malin released his eighth studio album Sunset Kids in August 2019. The album was produced by Lucinda Williams and Tom Overby, and features performances by Lucinda Williams, Billie Joe Armstrong, and Joseph Arthur. On April 10, 2020, Malin released the single, "Backstabbers", which was recorded during the sessions for Sunset Kids and appeared on his 2021 double album, Sad and Beautiful World.

Discography

Studio albums
2002: The Fine Art of Self Destruction
2004: The Heat
2007: Glitter in the Gutter
2008: On Your Sleeve
2010: Love It to Life
2015: New York Before the War
2015: Outsiders
2019: Sunset Kids
2021: Sad and Beautiful World

EPs
2000: So-Low Demos April 2000
2000: 169 
2003: The Wendy EP 
2017: Meet Me At The End Of The World

Live albums
2004: Messed Up Here Tonight
2008: Mercury Retrograde

Solo singles
2003: "Queen of the Underworld"
2003: "Wendy"
2003: "Happy Holidays 2003"
2003: "Messed Up Here Tonight"
2004: "Mona Lisa"
2007: "Tomorrow, Tonight"
2007: "Don't Let Them Take You Down"
2007: "Broken Radio"
2008: "In the Modern World"
2015: "Addicted"
2015: "Hardcore Feeling"
2015: "Hardcore Feeling II"
2016: "Whitestone City Limits"
2017: "Meet Me At The End Of The World"
2019: "Strangers & Thieves"
2020: "Backstabbers"
2020: "Todd Youth (Feat. H.R.)"
2020: "Ameri' Ka"
2021: "The Way We Used to Roll"
2021: "Crawling Back to You"
2021: "Tall Black Horses"
2021: "State of the Art"
2022: "Keep on Burning"

Collaborations

2001: To Be Somebody (Bellvue)
2002: Toxic Lullabies: 1980-1984 (Heart Attack)
2002: We Are Fuck You (The Finger)
2007: Broken Radio (Bruce Springsteen) 
2010: Depression Times (Green Day)

References

External links
Official website
 

American punk rock singers
Jewish American musicians
Singers from New York City
People from Queens, New York
1968 births
Living people
Adeline Records artists
Jews in punk rock
21st-century American Jews